The German People's Congress were a series of congresses held in Germany. They consisted of members of the Socialist Unity Party, the SED, and other political parties and mass organizations. Delegates from all over Germany gathered for the first time on 6 December 1947. Their main demand was the establishment of a German government.

Historical background
After the Second World War, the cooperation of the four victorious powers was soon superseded by East-West confrontation. The growing East-West conflict between the USSR and the Western powers, as well as a Soviet policy of building puppet regimes, led to distrust of Western powers in relation to the Soviet policy in Germany.  U.S. demands in the Allied Control Council, to preserve the economic unity of Germany, were dismissed in July 1946 by the USSR as an attempt to influence. The four-power administration over Germany ended no later than the last meeting of the Supervisory Council on 20 March 1948.

The London 6-Power Conference held in the first half of 1948 set out principles for the establishment of a democratic German state (the Frankfurt documents). While in the three western zones of the reconstruction of democracy was, went in the Soviet zone of occupation, the increasing uniformity of the semi-free elections in the Soviet zone in 1946 elected democratic institutions vonstatten. Since freely elected governments were not established in the countries in the Soviet area of occupation, the Prime Minister summarized in the west of Koblenz decisions, according to which democratic West German state as a temporary part to the restoration of German unity should be established in the wild.

People's Congress movement
The People's Congress movement was at the initiative of the Socialist Unity Party of Germany (SED) founded in 1947 and served as its first political forum for Germany to incorporate elements of direct democracy and civic groups in a representative government. They also used the SED to the involvement of political parties, mass organizations, cultural associations and individuals to achieve their political goals and was directed against the American and British policy and the Marshall Plan. Emerged from the movement of the German people's congresses, the first on 6/7 December 1947 of "delegates" of all occupation zones was composed. Prohibited under review and resistances against these SED initiative on the part of the Christian Democratic Union, and the removal of its chairman Jakob Kaiser and Ernst Lemmer through SMAD Western occupying powers to mobilize the People's Congresses in "Trizonia".

First congress

The First German People's Congress for Unity and a Just Peace was started on the initiative of the SED. Delegates from political parties and mass organizations elected who came from the Soviet zone of occupation. Only a small proportion came from the western zones. The representatives met on 6 and 7 December 1947 in Berlin. Participation in the People's Congress, was a source of much discussion among the parties in the Soviet zone. The refusal of the CDU to participate was one of the reasons that led to the dismissal of Jacob Kaiser as CDU chairman by the SMAD. Under strong pressure from the occupying power against the will of the majority of national associations, the Liberal Democratic Party decided to participate. The crucial point of criticism was that the Congress should not be composed according to the election results. By including the mass organizations had a higher distribution of members of the SED, which were usually also members of mass organizations, possible from the outset.

According to estimates by Erich Gniffke was due to the political affiliation of most members of mass organizations to the SED 62% of the participant member of the SED, and another 10% member of the Communist Party. Although these estimates are at odds with the official figures (see table) are available, it is clear that the SED had a clear majority in the People's Congress.  Topics included the rejection of the planned construction of a West German state and the criticism of the US-British occupation policy. They discussed the preparation of a peace treaty and an all-German government "composed of representatives of all democratic parties". Here, the Congress rejected much of the Soviet policy on Germany and supported this. This is the reason why this motion was approved by the Soviet Military Administration and supported by the SED. To represent the Congress appointed a 17-member delegation to the London Conference of Foreign Ministers (November–December 1947) the positions of the Congress. The foreign minister saw no legitimacy of the delegation and did not receive it.

Second congress
The Second German People's Congress was held on 17-18 March 1948, 18 March being the 100th anniversary of the German revolutions of 1848–1849. The Congress was attended by 1898 delegates, including 512 from the western zones.  It rejected both the Marshall Plan and the Oder-Neisse line, and agreed to hold a German reunification petition campaign, which took place from 23 May to 13 June 1948.

Furthermore, the First German People's Council was elected, which included 400 members, of which 100 were from West Germany. It formed a constitutional committee led by Otto Grotewohl and tasked with drawing up a draft constitution for the future German Democratic Republic.

Third congress

The Third German People's Congress on the population of the Soviet occupation zone 15 and 16 May 1949 by one vote confirms'. The 'choice' for the People's Congress was to assent (Yes) or reject (No), the following statement:

More than four million of the approximately 13.5 million eligible voters have ticked no. On the approval (officially about 66% of votes) are still reasonable doubt, as about a million unfilled ballots were counted as agreement.

On 29–30 May 1949 the German People's Congress convened in Berlin. 1400 delegates came from the Soviet occupation zone, 610 from the western zones (Trizone) located on 23 May was constituted as a federal republic. The draft Constitution, the Constitutional Committee of the People's Council had been drawn up on 30 May approved with one vote against, selected [5] and the Second German People's Council. The People's Council was constituted under the influence of the founding of the Federal Republic of Germany (May 23, 1949) on the same day as the Provisional People's Chamber on 7 October 1949 newly founded German Democratic Republic.

See also
German Economic Commission
German People's Council
People's Control Commission
Merger of the KPD and SPD into the Socialist Unity Party of Germany

References

Politics of East Germany
History of East Germany